In astronomy, the Tully–Fisher relation (TFR) is an empirical relationship between the mass or intrinsic luminosity of a spiral galaxy and its asymptotic rotation velocity or emission line width. It was first published in 1977 by astronomers R. Brent Tully and J. Richard Fisher.

Several different forms of the TFR exist, depending on which precise measures of mass, luminosity or rotation velocity one takes it to relate. Tully and Fisher used optical luminosity, but subsequent work showed the relation to be tighter when defined using microwave to infrared (K band) radiation (a good proxy for stellar mass), and even tighter when luminosity is replaced by the galaxy's total baryonic mass (the sum of its mass in stars and gas). This latter form of the relation is known as the baryonic Tully–Fisher relation (BTFR), and states that baryonic mass is proportional to velocity to the power of roughly 3.5–4.

The TFR can be used to estimate the distance to spiral galaxies by allowing the luminosity of a galaxy to be derived from its directly measurable line width. The distance can then be found by comparing the luminosity to the apparent brightness. Thus the TFR constitutes a rung of the cosmic distance ladder, where it is calibrated using more direct distance measurement techniques and used in turn to calibrate methods extending to larger distance.

In the dark matter paradigm, a galaxy's rotation velocity (and hence line width) is primarily determined by the mass of the dark matter halo in which it lives, making the TFR a manifestation of the connection between visible and dark matter mass. In Modified Newtonian dynamics (MOND), the BTFR (with power-law index exactly 4) is a direct consequence of the  gravitational force law effective at low acceleration.

The analogues of the TFR for non-rotationally-supported galaxies, such as ellipticals, are known as the Faber–Jackson relation and the fundamental plane.

See also 

 Distance modulus
 Standard candle
 Cosmic distance ladder
 Faber–Jackson relation
 Fundamental plane
 Dark matter
 Standard model of cosmology
 Modified Newtonian dynamics

References

External links
 Scholarpedia article on the subject written by R. Brent Tully

Extragalactic astronomy
Spiral galaxies